The Les Trophées du Libre contest was a free software contest whose goal was to promote innovative software projects by giving those projects recognition and media coverage as well as rewarding participating students and academic institutions with special prizes.

Details 
The competition was international and it was intended both to free development professionals and amateurs. Participating projects could apply for seven categories: Security, Games, Multimedia, Business Management, Education, Science applications and administration and communities.

The first edition (2003) had 113 applying projects from 18 different countries.

The president for the 2009 edition was Pierre Spilleboudt. The jury was composed of about 30 experts. The Trophées du Libre'''s fifth award ceremony took place in June 2009.

Results

1st edition – 2003
 Gcompris in the category of "Educational"
 Koha in the category "Public Organizations"
 GOK in the category of "Accessibility"
 Dolibarr in the category "Management Company"
 Weasel Reader in the category of "Public"
 Vega Strike in the category "Games"

 2nd edition – 2005
 Lodel in the category "Public Organizations and Communities"
 Prométhée in the category of "Education"
 MedinTux in the category "Business Management"
 VideoLAN in the category of "Multimedia"
 NuFW in the category "Security"
 MediaWiki as "Special Prize PHP"

 3rd edition – 2006 

 Public Organizations and Communities
 OpenElec, complete management tools of the electoral rolls
 demexp, system waiter of vote on computer
 OpenJUMP, geographical information system

 Education
 Stellarium, a planetarium computerized for the exploration of stars, constellations, and other heavenly bodies
 ICONITO, gate dedicated to the educational/school actors integrating tools and resources
 Prométhée, "ready to use" open source Virtual Learning Environment for schools 100% free
 Business Management:
 Open Mobile IS, framework for the development of mobile applications of companies
 SpagoBI, integrated platform of decisional data processing
 Pentaho, platform of decisional and management of flows in company
 Multimedia
 Ekiga (GnomeMeeting), software of telephony on Internet
 Gcstar, personal manager of collections multimedia
 Azureus, P2P-client for the distribution of big binary files
 Security
 OCS Inventory Next Generation, tool for monitoring the configuration of the software on networks
 GLPI, management tool of helpdesk under licence GPL
 M0n0wall, firewall multipurpose
 PHP
 alternc, software of management of mutualized lodging
 phpMyVisites, measure of audience and statistics for the Web sites
 phpMyAdmin, Web manager for the database MySQL, translated into 50 languages

4th edition – 2007

Special prize of the jury: Bioclipse.

5th edition – 2009

Special awards:

 Open source spirit award: Ksplice Special jury award: Coherence Innovative project award: GRAPHITE''

The 5th edition (2009) was the last one of this contest and online web portal of contest is not available anymore.

See also

 List of computer-related awards

References

Free-software awards
Programming contests